The 2007 ASB Classic was a women's professional tennis tournament played on outdoor hard courts. It was the 22nd edition of the ASB Classic, and was part of the Tier IV Series of the 2007 WTA Tour. It took place at the ASB Tennis Centre in Auckland, New Zealand, from 1 – 6 January 2007.

Finals

Singles

 Jelena Janković defeated  Vera Zvonareva, 7–6(11–9), 5–7, 6–3
 It was Janković's 1st title of the year and 2nd of her career

Doubles

 Janette Husárová /  Paola Suárez defeated  Hsieh Su-wei /  Shikha Uberoi, 6–0, 6–2
 It was Husárová's 1st title of the year and 22nd of her career
 It was Suárez's 1st title of the year and 43rd of her career

See also
 2007 Heineken Open – men's tournament

References
 http://www.itftennis.com/procircuit/tournaments/women's-tournament/info.aspx?tournamentid=1100014999

External links
 ASB Classic Home Page

WTA Auckland Open
2007 WTA Tour
ASB
ASB
2007 in New Zealand tennis